Wingette may refer to 
Wing Bowl
Middle section of chicken wings